Vivaan Arora is a Punjabi actor who has appeared in Punjabi films such as Aish Kar Lai, Ek Wari Haan Karde and Dramebaaz kalakar (2017).He has also appeared in some Indian television series, like Khushiyon Kii Gullak Aashi, SuperCops vs Supervillains, Savdhaan India and Aahat (season 6).

Filmography

Film
Aish Kar Lai
Ek Wari Haan Karde

Television
Sony Pal's Khushiyon Kii Gullak Aashi
Life OK's SuperCops vs Supervillains, Savdhaan India
Sony TV's Aahat (season 6)

References

Living people
Male actors in Punjabi cinema
Indian male television actors
Male actors in Hindi television
Male actors from Mumbai
Year of birth missing (living people)